Rochelle Abramson is a violinist in Los Angeles, California.

She is a first violinist with the Los Angeles Philharmonic.
She has served as concertmaster of various local orchestras, and currently is concertmaster with the Valley Symphony Orchestra.

She joined the Los Angeles Philharmonic in its 1978/79 season.  She received two individual artist's grants from the City of Los Angeles Cultural Affairs Department.

References

Living people
Year of birth missing (living people)
American violinists
21st-century violinists